The Course of the Inevitable is the fourth studio album by American rapper Lloyd Banks. It was released on June 4, 2021. It is his first full-length studio album since H.F.M. 2 (2010), and his first to be released since his departure from G-Unit Records in 2018.

Background 
On April 30, 2021, during his 39th birthday, Lloyd Banks released an instrumental teaser for the album, revealing only the acronym for the album title. On May 14, 2021, a similar teaser was released, this time with a brief spoken-word monologue from poet Rashan Brown recorded over the same piano backing. A full three-minute trailer would then be released exactly a week later on May 21, 2021, not only having an extended spoken-word monologue from Brown over the same piano backing (which would become the instrumental for the album track "Sidewalks"), but also revealing the album's full title.

On May 25, 2021, Banks revealed the cover art and the album’s tracklist on Instagram. Three days prior to the album's release, on June 1, the tracklist was then updated with a Freddie Gibbs feature on the song "Empathy".

Reception

Critical response
The Course of the Inevitable received critical acclaim from music critics. AllMusic's Andy Kellman called the album "a conspicuous return, the reclamation of a lane the rapper started to navigate with proficiency in the early 2000s", while Chase McMullen from Beats Per Minute stated, that the album "is just about the most lyrically dense statement in hip hop in recent memory, layered from top to bottom with fatigue and meaning to the extent that you'd think he was writing sentences over one another".

Commercial performance
In the United States, the project debuted at number 84 on the Billboard 200, selling 12,000 copies in its first week. In the United Kingdom, it peaked number 9 on the R&B Albums chart.

Track listing

Charts

References

External links

2021 albums
Lloyd Banks albums